Oleksiy Bazyuk (26 March 1873 – 12 June 1952) was a Greek Catholic hierarch. He served as the single Apostolic Administrator of the Ruthenian Catholic Apostolic Administration of Bosnia-Hercegovina from its  establishing on 9 October 1914 until its dissolution in 1925.

Early life and service
Oleksiy Bazyuk was born in the family of Greek-Catholics in 1873 in the Ukrainian Catholic Archeparchy of Lviv. After graduation of the popular school and gymnasium education in Stryi in 1894, he joined Faculty of Theology of the University of Lviv and the Greek-Catholic Theological Seminary in Lviv.

He was ordained as priest on April 9, 1898 by Metropolitan Joseph Sembratovych for the Archeparchy of Lviv, while completing his studies in Rome. After the one year parish work, Fr. Bazyuk continued to study in the University of Vienna and served simultaneously as an assistant priest in St. Barbara's church in Vienna (1898–1900). After returning he served as a parish priest  in the different villages until 1908, when he went to serve among Ukrainians in Germany for six years and was elevated in rank of a Protonotary apostolic in 1913.

Apostolic Administrator
On October 9, 1914, Fr. Bazyuk was appointed by Pope Benedict XV the first Apostolic Administrator of the new created Apostolic Administration of Bosnia-Hercegovina (that was established from the Greek Catholic Eparchy of Križevci) without dignity of bishop. He served in office until 1925 with the sees in Sarajevo (1914–1917) and after – in Banja Luka (1917–1925), when the Apostolic Administration was suppressed and merged again with the Eparchy of Križevci. But Fr. Bazyuk continued to serve in Bosnia until the end of 1926 as a parish priest in Banja Luka and the Apostolic Vicar of Bosnia-Hercegovina.

Last years
In 1927 he returned to his native Archeparchy of Lviv and was a member of the Metropolitan Curia. After the Soviet annexation of Western Ukraine in 1939 he became a parish priest in village Chesnyky near Rohatyn. When the Communist regime abolished the Greek-Catholic Church in 1946, he clandestinely continued to serve as a priest in the Carpathian Mountains village Volosianka and after in Lavochne, where he died on June 12, 1952, in the age 79.

References

1873 births
1952 deaths
People from Lviv Oblast
People from the Kingdom of Galicia and Lodomeria
University of Lviv alumni
Lviv Seminary alumni
University of Vienna alumni
Ukrainian expatriates in Germany
Ukrainian expatriates in Austria
Ukrainian expatriates in Bosnia and Herzegovina
Ukrainian Eastern Catholics
Ukrainian Austro-Hungarians